Mathilde Moreau is an Ivorian painter.

Education and career
She studied at Ecole Nationale des Beaux Arts in Abidjan where she obtained a DCSA (Advanced Diploma of Fine Arts) in 1986.

In 1983–1994 she was a professor of Fine Arts at Harris School of Modern in Abidjan. Then worked as a professor of painting at Ecole Nationale des Beaux Arts in Abidjan between 1994 and 2006.

Between 2003 and 2005 she was a researcher at the Central Academy of Fine Arts in Beijing on Chinese traditional painting.

Since 2006, she has been the Director of the Ecole Nationale des Beaux Arts in Abidjan.

She was one of the precursors of the Vohou-Vohou movement born at L'Ecole des Beaux Arts of Abidjan in the 1970s. Vohou-Vohou is the refusal of using very expensive painting materials. Other precursors were: Yusuf Bath, Kra N'Guessan, Théodore Koudougnon, Mathilde Moreau.

Group exhibitions

 20 September – 20 November 2008	African Artists in Residence at the Institute of Fine Arts Shenzhen
 5 June – 5 July 2008	 Curated by Yacouba Konate at the headquarters of the BICICI the Plateau. The artists are; Abdoulaye Konate, Koffi Setordji, Ki Siriki, Michel Kodjo, Jean-Claude Henein, Mathilde Moreau, Youssouf Kourouma, Augustin Kassi, Jacoblen, Watt Kang, Mamery Ballo, Ange-Martial Shiner and Cherif Souleymane 
 16–31 August 1997	"Art Collection of the century from 1995 to 2000", Piotrkòw Trybunalski, Poland
 19–29 September 1996	"Biennial of Contemporary African Art", Museum of African Art of IFAN Cheikh Anta Diop (With 05 works selected)
 2 June – 9 July 1995	"Café des Artistes" in Lausanne, Switzerland
 24 November – 8 December 1993	"Grafolies", Biennale d’Abidjan in Abidjan (Ivory Coast)

Solo exhibitions

 13 March – 4 April 2004	Exhibition at the Cultural Center of Africa, Oslo, Norway
 20 November – 2 December 2000	 "Return to China" at French Cultural Center Abidjan, Ivory Coast
 January – March 2000	"African Art" in Beijing and Shanghai, China
 20 November – 15 December 1997	"Africa to the Heart" Paris, France

Bibliography

 "Zeitgenössische Kunst aus Afrika: 14 Gegenwartskünstler aus Côte d’Ivoire und Bénin", Author: Thomas Fillitz, Böhlau, 2002, Product Dimensions: 25 x 17.9 x 3.4 cm,in German

References

1958 births
Living people
Ivorian painters
Ivorian women painters
People from Grand-Bassam
21st-century women artists